Stewart Murdoch (born 9 May 1990) is professional footballer playing as a midfielder or defender for East Fife. Murdoch came through the youth academy at Falkirk, and over a six-year period played 88 games in all competitions for The Bairns, in which the majority of these came in the Scottish First Division. He also spent time on loan in the Scottish Second Division playing for Berwick Rangers in season 2007–08 and for East Fife in seasons 2009–10 and 2010–11.

Murdoch played for Fleetwood Town in English Football League One and English Football League Two from 2013 until 2015. He also spent time on loan in the English League Two playing for Northampton Town in season 2014–15. Murdoch then played for Ross County in the Scottish Premiership in season 2015–16, before moving to Dundee United. In season 2018–19, Murdoch returned on loan to East Fife before signing a permanent deal for the following season.

Career

Falkirk
Murdoch came through the youth academy at Falkirk and remained there until 2007, when he signed his first professional contract and was included in the club's first team photo for the 2007–08 season. Ahead of the 2009–10 season, he signed a one-year contract with the club. Murdoch made his Falkirk first team debut on 8 November 2009, in a 3–3 home draw against Celtic, coming on as an 87th-minute substitute for Ryan Flynn. Murdoch made two further substitute appearances before going out on loan.

Loan spells
Murdoch made his Berwick Rangers first team debut in a 4–0 loss to Ayr United on 2 January 2008 after joining on a month-long loan from Falkirk. He made four appearances scoring no goals during this loan period.

Murdoch made his East Fife first team debut in a 1–1 draw away at Stenhousemuir on 27 February 2010 after joining on loan from Falkirk until the end of the 2009–10 season. He scored his only goal in 14 appearances this season in a 3–1 victory over Arbroath on 16 March 2010. He was sent on loan to East Fife again at the start of the 2010–11 season and played 10 games scoring no goals.

Return to Falkirk
Murdoch returned to Falkirk and made his first start for them in a 1–0 away defeat against Partick Thistle in a Scottish Cup fourth round replay on 18 January 2011. He scored his first goal for the club in the home 2–0 victory against Cowdenbeath on 26 February 2011.

In the 2011–12 season, Murdoch was shown the first red card of his career in a 1–1 draw away at Livingston on 10 September 2011 and after the match, the club decided not to appeal his sending off. Murdoch scored the winning penalty in a 5–4 shootout victory after a 2–2 draw in the quarterfinals of the League Cup away at Dundee United on 25 October 2011. He was then part of the Falkirk squad that won the 2011–12 Scottish Challenge Cup. Murdoch played in a number of the earlier rounds, however he had to sit out the 1–0 final victory over Hamilton on 1 April 2012 due to injury. Due to his injury, Manager Steven Pressley said Murdoch's injury is "disappointing" with his season over and said that he has been a terrific influence on the squad. During the season, Pressley praised Murdoch for his good displays and nicknamed him "Lazarus".

In the 2012–13 season, Murdoch was then chosen to be the Falkirk penalty taker, scoring penalties in the 2–1 defeat to Livingston on 2 September 2012, in the 1–1 draw with Airdrie United on 22 September 2012 and in the 2–0 victory over Cowdenbeath on 15 December 2012. He then scored his first goal in open play in nearly two years when he scored in the 4–3 victory over Airdrie United on 26 January 2013 and followed that up on 2 February 2013 in the fifth round of the Scottish Cup with a goal in the 4–1 victory over Forfar Athletic. Murdoch then scored a 90th-minute header to secure Falkirk a 1–1 league draw against Raith Rovers on 5 March 2013. At the end of the 2012–13 season, Murdoch was offered a new deal by Falkirk and he was then awarded the Falkirk Herald Starshot prize. However, on 14 June 2013, Murdoch turned down the chance to stay in Scotland, moving instead to English outfit Fleetwood Town.

Fleetwood Town
On 14 June 2013, Fleetwood Town confirmed the signing of Murdoch on a two-year deal. Ahead of his debut, Murdoch said he was aiming to win a first team place.

In the opening game of the season, on 3 August 2013, against Dagenham & Redbridge, Murdoch made his debut, coming on as a 70th-minute substitute for Steven Schumacher, in a 3–1 victory. He was promoted to League One with Fleetwood in his first season with the club, after they won the League Two playoffs, defeating Burton Albion 1–0 in the final at Wembley Stadium on 26 May 2014. Murdoch came on as an 86th-minute substitute for Iain Hume in the final. In his first season at Fleetwood, Murdoch made forty-seven appearances for the club in all competitions.

Murdoch's second season at the club was not as good as his first season with his first team opportunities limited mostly to appearances on the substitutes bench. As a result, he joined Northampton Town on loan on 30 October 2014, with the loan due to end on 3 January 2015. He made his debut on 1 November 2014 in a 2–0 victory over AFC Wimbledon. Murdoch scored his first goal in English football and his only goal in 8 appearances for Northampton in a 3–2 defeat against Plymouth Argyle on 13 December 2014. By January, Murdoch's loan spell with Northampton came to an end and he returned to his parent club.

Murdoch made his first appearance for Fleetwood since returning from his loan spell with Northampton Town on 10 February 2015, in a 1–0 win over Barnsley and made nine more appearances for the club. At the end of the 2014–15 season, Murdoch was released by Fleetwood on 6 May 2015, after making 61 appearances in all competitions and scoring no goals.

Ross County
On 17 June 2015, Ross County confirmed the signing of Murdoch on a two-year deal. He made his Ross County debut against Celtic on 1 August 2015, in a 2–0 defeat. Murdoch then scored his first Ross County goal, scoring the second goal in a 3–1 win against Hamilton Academical on 12 December 2015. Murdoch won the 2015–16 Scottish League Cup with Ross County who defeated Hibernian in the final 2–1 on 13 March 2016, coming on as a 79th-minute substitute for Ian McShane. On 24 April 2016, he scored his second Ross County goal scoring the equaliser in a 1–1 draw with Celtic. At the end of the 2015–16 season, Murdoch was released by Ross County on 13 June 2016, after making 34 appearances in all competitions and scoring 2 goals.

Dundee United
On 14 June 2016, Murdoch signed for Scottish Championship club Dundee United on an initial one-year deal. He scored his first goal for Dundee United on 23 July 2016 in a 1–1 draw against Inverness Caledonian Thistle in the group stage of the 2016-17 Scottish League Cup. On 21 June 2017, Murdoch signed a new two-year contract with Dundee United. He joined East Fife on loan in February 2019.

East Fife
On 28 May 2019, Murdoch signed a permanent deal with East Fife.

Career statistics

Honours
Falkirk
Scottish Challenge Cup: 2011–12

Fleetwood Town
Football League Two Play Offs: 2013–14

Ross County
Scottish League Cup: 2015–16

Dundee United
 Scottish Challenge Cup: 2016-17

References

External links

 First name spelt wrong

Falkirk F.C. players
Scottish Football League players
1990 births
Living people
Scottish footballers
Footballers from Aberdeen
Association football midfielders
Berwick Rangers F.C. players
East Fife F.C. players
Fleetwood Town F.C. players
Northampton Town F.C. players
Ross County F.C. players
English Football League players
Scottish Professional Football League players
Dundee United F.C. players